Anne Patricia Jones (born 28 July 1955) is an Australian writer, editor, and administrator. She is one of two working directors of ToadShow Pty Ltd, a Brisbane-based design company, where she is managing partner and company chair. In 1981 she was co editor of Semper Floreat the University of Queensland student newspaper.

In 1982 and 1983 she was station coordinator of 4ZZZ. In 1983 she co-founded, with Damien Ledwich and Matt Mawson, the second version of The Cane Toad Times. In 1986 she was a trainee writer with P. P. Cranney on the play Sweeping Statements, about the Federated Miscellaneous Workers Union, produced by Street Arts. Also in 1986 under the name ToadShow she administered the production of Hound of Music at the Princess Theatre, in Brisbane, Queensland.

In 1999 she was appointed to the Board of the Queensland Museum and served as Chair of the Queensland Museum Board from 2002 to 2008. She was awarded the Queensland Museum Medal in 2009.  In 2010 she became an Ambassador of the Queensland Museum, a role in the Queensland Museum Foundation. In 2011 a spider species, Opopaea jonesae, was named after her in recognition of her service to the museum.

In 2011 Jones was appointed to the board of Healthy Waterways now known as Healthy Land & Water, a not-for-profit membership-based organisation working to protect and improve waterway health in South East Queensland.

References

External links 
 ToadShow http://www.toadshow.com.au

Living people
Australian writers
1955 births